Muhammad Ali (‎; 1874 – 13 October 1951) was a British Indian, and a Pakistani writer, scholar, and leading figure of the Lahore Ahmadiyya Movement.

Biography
Ali was born in Murar, Kapurthala State (now in Ludhiana district, Punjab, India) in 1874. He obtained a Master of Arts in English and a Bachelor of Laws in 1899. He joined the Ahmadiyya Movement in 1897 and dedicated his life to the service of the movement as part of what he saw as a restored and pristine Islam. He died in Karachi on October 13, 1951, and is buried in Lahore.

Marmaduke Pickthall, British Muslim and translator of the Quran into English, wrote a review of Muhammad Ali's book The Religion of Islam when this book was published in 1936. The review was published in the journal Islamic Culture of Hyderabad Deccan (India), whose editor was Pickthall. In this review Pickthall wrote:

Works

See also
 Ahmadiyya

Notes

References
Maulana Muhammad Ali, Detailed information website about Maulana Muhammad Ali
 A Mighty Striving, Detailed biography of Maulana Muhammad Ali

External links

 The Holy Qur-án, Lahore, The Islamic Review Office, Surrey, 1917 (First Edition) Quran Archive
 Lets Learn Quran includes the Quran translation by Maulana Muhammad Ali
Online Quran Project includes the Qur'an translation by Maulana Muhammad Ali.
 Selection of Maulana Muhammad Ali works available online
 List of Books by Maulana Muhammad Ali

Emirs of the Lahore Ahmadiyya Movement
Pakistani Ahmadis
1874 births
1951 deaths
People from British India
Translators of the Quran into English